Lester Petrie (1878–1956) was an American politician and Mayor of Honolulu from 1941 to 1947, including when the city was attacked on December 7, 1941, by the Japanese military.

References

Mayors of Honolulu
1878 births
1956 deaths
Hawaii Democrats